Don Bartolomé de Alva was a Novohispanic mestizo secular priest and Nahuatl translator. He was a younger brother of the chronicler don Fernando de Alva Ixtlilxochitl.

Alva received a Bachelor of Arts degree from the University of Mexico in 1622, and subsequently a licentiate. He probably entered the priesthood in 1625. In 1634 he published a Nahuatl-language confessionary, for the use of priests administering confession to Nahuas. Around 1640 he translated and adapted Spanish plays into the Nahuatl language and Nahua culture; these were then used by Horacio Carochi to draw examples from for his grammar of Nahuatl, published in 1645. Alva was one of the examiners who approved the grammar for publication, writing that "the author, by dint of study, has attained the ability to explain masterfully in the Mexican [i.e. Nahuatl] and Otomi languages what the very natives, although they reach an understanding of it, hardly manage to express."

Notes

References

 

1590s births
17th-century deaths
Nahua people
Mestizo writers
Royal and Pontifical University of Mexico alumni
17th-century translators